The  tadpole sculpin (Psychrolutes paradoxus) is a species of marine ray-finned fish belonging to the family Psychrolutidae, the fatheads and toadfishes. This species is found in the North Pacific Ocean from the Sea of Okhotsk and the Sea of Japan north to the Bering Sea and east and south to the southern Puget Sound in Washington.

References

Psychrolutes
Fish described in 1861
Taxa named by Albert Günther